Andrea Verešová (born 28 June 1980) is a Slovak model and beauty queen, winner of Miss Slovakia.

Verešová studied at a Belgian lycée in Žilina, where she graduated. She was formerly in a relationship with Czech hockey star Jaromír Jágr.

In May 2010 Verešová appeared on the cover issue of the Czech language edition of Playboy.

References

External links 
 
Instagram
Facebook

1980 births
Living people
Slovak female models
People from Žilina
Miss World 1999 delegates
Slovak expatriates in the Czech Republic
University of West Bohemia alumni
Slovak beauty pageant winners